Ancistrus cuiabae is a species of catfish in the family Loricariidae. It is native to South America, where it occurs in the Cuiabá River basin, which is part of the Paraguay River drainage in Brazil. The species reaches 11.5 cm (4.5 inches) SL.

References 

cuiabae
Fish described in 1999
Catfish of South America